= Kingdom of Austria =

Kingdom of Austria is a misnomer, which may refer to:

- Archduchy of Austria
- Habsburg monarchy
- Austrian Empire
- Austria-Hungary
